Emanuele Federici (born 17 August 1978) is an Italian lightweight rower. He won a gold medal at the 2002 World Rowing Championships in Seville with the lightweight men's quadruple scull.

References

1978 births
Living people
Italian male rowers
World Rowing Championships medalists for Italy